The Jewish Legion (1917–1919) was the battalions of the Royal Fusiliers of the British Army that fought in World War I .

Jewish Legion may also refer to:
The Jewish Cavalry Regiment (1792–1794), commanded by Berek Joselewicz participated in the Kościuszko Uprising in Poland 
The Jewish Brigade (1940–1946), part of the British Army in World War II
The Jewish Legion (Anders Army) (1941-1942) was a proposed unit in the Polish Anders Army in USSR during World War II